The 2003 NBA All-Star Game was an exhibition basketball game which was played on February 9, 2003 at the Philips Arena in Atlanta, home of the Atlanta Hawks. This game was the 52nd edition of the North American National Basketball Association (NBA) All-Star Game and was played during the 2002–03 NBA season.

The West defeated the East 155–145 in double overtime, with Kevin Garnett of the Minnesota Timberwolves winning the Most Valuable Player. Garnett scored 37 points, grabbed 9 rebounds, and had 5 steals. Allen Iverson led the East with 35 points.

This was the first All-Star Game to be transmitted on cable television, through TNT. This was also the 14th and final All-Star Game that Michael Jordan participated in, as a result of his final retirement after the 2002–03 season.

The 2003 game is the last NBA All-Star Game to be decided in overtime.

All-Star Game

Coaches

The coach for the Western Conference team was Sacramento Kings head coach Rick Adelman. The coach for the Eastern Conference team was Indiana Pacers head coach Isiah Thomas. The Pacers had a 34–15 record on February 9.

Players

The rosters for the All-Star Game were chosen in two ways. The starters were chosen via a fan ballot. Two guards, two forwards and one center who received the highest vote were named the All-Star starters. This was also the first time that the league offered All-Star ballots in three languages — English, Spanish and Chinese — for fan voting of the starters. The reserves were chosen by votes among the NBA head coaches in their respective conferences. The coaches were not permitted to vote for their own players. The reserves consist of two guards, two forwards, one center and two players regardless of position. If a player is unable to participate due to injury, the commissioner will select a replacement.

Kobe Bryant of the Los Angeles Lakers led the ballots with 1,474,386 votes, which earned him a starting position as a guard in the Western Conference team for the fifth year in a row. Yao Ming, of the Houston Rockets, was the second player with the most votes for the West, becoming the first rookie starter in the All-Star Game since Grant Hill in 1995. Yao was voted to start over Shaquille O'Neal, who was coming off three consecutive NBA Finals MVP Awards, receiving nearly a quarter million more votes than the Lakers center. Steve Francis, Kevin Garnett, and Tim Duncan completed the Western Conference starting positions. Bryant, Garnett, Francis, and Duncan were all starters for the previous year's Western Conference team. The Western Conference reserves included one first-time selection, Shawn Marion, of the Phoenix Suns. The squad was rounded out by Gary Payton, Steve Nash, Dirk Nowitzki, Chris Webber, Peja Stojaković, Stephon Marbury, and Shaquille O'Neal. Five teams, Los Angeles Lakers, Dallas Mavericks, Houston Rockets, Sacramento Kings, and Phoenix Suns, had two representations at the All-Star Game with Bryant/O'Neal, Nash/Nowitzki, Francis/Yao, Webber/Stojaković and Marion/Marbury.

The Eastern Conference's leading vote-getter was Tracy McGrady, who earned his third consecutive All-Star Game selection with 1,316,297 votes. Allen Iverson, Vince Carter, Jermaine O'Neal, and Ben Wallace completed the Eastern Conference starting position. This was Wallace's first All-Star selection, as he led the league in rebounding. This was also the fourth consecutive All-Star appearance by Iverson and Carter, and O'Neal's second appearance as an All-Star. The Eastern Conference reserves included three first-time selections, Brad Miller, Jamal Mashburn, and Žydrūnas Ilgauskas. Michael Jordan, Jason Kidd, Paul Pierce, and Antoine Walker rounded out the team. However, Carter relinquished his starting spot to Jordan, so he could start his final All-Star Game. Two teams, Indiana Pacers and Boston Celtics, had two representations at the All-Star Game with O'Neal/Miller, and Walker/Pierce.

Roster

 Chris Webber was unable to participate due to injury.
 Peja Stojaković was named as Webber's replacement.

Game

The Western All-Stars won the game 155–145 in double overtime. It seemed the East were on way to a victory when Jordan hit a jump shot to give the East a 138–136 lead with 4.8 seconds remaining in overtime. However, Jermaine O'Neal fouled Kobe Bryant while shooting a three-point field goal with one second remaining. Bryant hit two of the three shots to tie the game, resulting in the first double-overtime in All-Star history. In the second overtime, Kevin Garnett hit three jumpers in the post over a smaller Vince Carter to lead the West to victory. Garnett won the MVP award after scoring a game-high 37 points. It was Jordan's final All-Star game. After declining Allen Iverson and Tracy McGrady's offers to give him their starting spot, he accepted Vince Carter's last minute offer.

The halftime show featured Mariah Carey wearing a dress in the style of Jordan's Wizards jersey who sang the song Hero, alongside a video montage celebrating Jordan's career. Afterwards, Carey introduced Jordan to a standing ovation from both the West and East all-stars and the crowd. Jordan thanked his former teammates, adversaries, family, and the fans for everything he had achieved in his career, ending with him saying that he can go home and be at peace with the game of basketball.

All-Star Weekend

Slam Dunk Contest

Three-Point Contest

References

National Basketball Association All-Star Game
Basketball competitions in Atlanta
All-Star
2003 in sports in Georgia (U.S. state)